The 2021 Donegal Senior Football Championship was the 99th official edition of Donegal GAA's premier Gaelic football tournament for senior graded clubs in County Donegal. 16 teams competed, with the winner representing Donegal in the Ulster Senior Club Football Championship.

Naomh Conaill were the defending champions after they defeated Cill Chartha in a penalty competition held after extra-time in the 2020 final.

Naomh Conaill advanced to the 2021 final but lost to St Eunan's.

Team changes
The following teams changed division since the 2020 championship season.

To S.F.C.
Promoted from 2020 I.F.C.
 Aodh Ruadh -  (I.F.C. Champions)

From S.F.C.
Relegated to 2021 I.F.C.
 ?

League stage
The competition began with a league stage. The draw for the first two rounds was held in June 2021, with the identity of the 2020 Championship winner still unknown, a first such event in the competition's history.

Round 1

Round 2

Round 3
The Round 3 draw was made on 26 September, giving the following fixtures: Ard an Rátha v Kilcar, Seán MacCumhaills v Réalt na Mara, Naomh Conaill v Termon, St Naul's v Glenswilly, Gaoth Dobhair v Glenfin, Na Cealla Beaga v Milford, St Eunan's v Aodh Ruadh and Four Masters v St Michael's.

 Ard an Rátha v Kilcar Report
 Seán MacCumhaills v Réalt na Mara Report
 Naomh Conaill v Termon Report
 St Naul's v Glenswilly
 Gaoth Dobhair v Glenfin Report Report
 Na Cealla Beaga v Milford Report
 St Eunan's v Aodh Ruadh
 Four Masters v St Michael's

Round 4
The Round 4 draw was made in early October, giving the following fixtures: Kilcar v Gaoth Dobhair, Aodh Ruadh v Ard an Rátha, Réalt na Mara v St Eunan's, Termon v Seán MacCumhaills, Glenswilly v Naomh Conaill, St Michael's v Na Cealla Beaga, Glenfin v Four Masters and Milford v St Naul's. Three clubs had by then advanced to the knockout stages – Gaoth Dobhair, Kilcar and Naomh Conaill. Going into Round 4, played on the weekend of October 9, St Eunan's, Glenswilly, St Naul's, St Michael's and Aodh Ruadh sat in the remaining five places.

 St Michael's 3–10 — 1–07 Na Cealla Beaga
 Termon 1–12 — 1–18 Seán MacCumhaills Report
 Milford 0–09 — 2–16 St Naul's
 Réalt na Mara 1–07 — 0–14 St Eunan's
 Glenswilly 0–15 — 1–15 Naomh Conaill
 Aodh Ruadh 1–16 — 2–07 Ard an Rátha Report
 Glenfin 0–20 — 0–06 Four Masters Report
 Kilcar v Gaoth Dobhair ?

Knock-out stage

Quarter-finals
Gaoth Dobhair and Naomh Conaill, the last two clubs to win the competition, were paired with each other in the quarter-final draw. Seán MacCumhaills and Kilcar met in the other quarter-final on that side of the draw. On the other side of the draw St Eunan's and St Naul's played each other in one quarter-final, while St Michael's and Aodh Ruadh played each other in the other quarter-final.

Semi-finals
The semi-final meeting of Kilcar and Naomh Conaill was shown live to a national audience on TG4. Naomh Conaill won, after a late Patrick McBrearty goal that would have brought the sides level, was ruled out.

Final
It was Naomh Conaill's fifth consecutive appearance in the final. The game was televised live on TG4. A minute's silence was held before the game in memory of Martin Griffin, whose sudden death occurred the previous day. St Eunan's won.

Relegation play-offs
Eight clubs (Glenfin, Glenswilly, Réalta na Mara, Ard an Rátha, Milford, Na Cealla Beaga, Termon and Four Masters) entered the draw for the relegation play-offs once the quarter-final line-up was confirmed.

Ulster Senior Club Football Championship

St Eunan's advanced to the 2021 Ulster Senior Club Football Championship.

Watty Graham's knocked St Eunan's out of that competition with an injury time point from Danny Tallon winning the game at O'Donnell Park, despite St Eunan's scoring the only goal and leading for much of the game and Shaun Patton saving a penalty.

Television rights
The following matches were broadcast live on national television, unless otherwise indicated:

Statistics

Top scorers
Top scorer overall

References

External links
 "Club by club guide to the Donegal Senior Football Championship" — Peter Campbell, Tom Comack and Gerry McLaughlin profile the 16 clubs who will go in search of the Dr Maguire
 "Team of the Championship" — Donegal News

Donegal Senior Football Championship
Donegal SFC
Donegal Senior Football Championship